The 2004 Carolina Dodge Dealers 400 was the 5th stock car race of the 2004 NASCAR Nextel Cup Series season and the 49th iteration of the event. The race was held before a crowd of 56,000 on March 21, 2004 at Darlington Raceway in Darlington, South Carolina. Jimmie Johnson of Hendrick Motorsports would win the race, leading 69 laps. Bobby Labonte of Joe Gibbs Racing and Ryan Newman of Penske-Jasper Racing would take 2nd and 3rd, respectively.

The race would be the last spring Darlington race until 2020 when the COVID-19 pandemic forced NASCAR to race at Darlington in the spring, as the Ferko lawsuit would move the second race that Darlington originally had, the Southern 500, to Texas Motor Speedway for a promised second date to Texas. The Carolina Dodge Dealers 400 would therefore move to the fall and be lengthened to 500 miles, making the race the new Southern 500. In 2020, the COVID-19 pandemic would make NASCAR race once again at Darlington in the spring, and in 2021 after rekindled fan interest, would announce that Darlington would once again get its spring 400-mile race, this time called the Goodyear 400.

Background

Qualifying 
Qualifying took place on March 19, 2004. Meanwhile, Michael Waltrip, driver of the #15 Dale Earnhardt, Inc. Chevrolet would not set a time, due to Waltrip scrubbing the wall in Turn 2. Instead of completing a lap, Waltrip would take a provisional and qualify 39th.

Stanton Barrett of W. W. Motorsports would be the only driver not to qualify due to the provisional system set in place by NASCAR at the time.

Race

Pre-race ceremonies 
Pre-race ceremonies would start with Darlington Raceway chaplain Harold King giving out the invocation. The contemporary Christian music group NewSong would sing the national anthem, with the 108th Squadron of the United States Navy Strike Force from Virginia Beach, Virginia performing the flyover. Five members of the Carolina Dodge Dealers Association would give the starting command.

Race recap

Post-race driver comments

Race results

References 

Carolina Dodge Dealers 400
Carolina Dodge Dealers 400
NASCAR races at Darlington Raceway
Carolina Dodge Dealers 400